Fuse is the seventh studio album by the Canadian blues/rock musician Colin James, which was released in 2000.

Track listing
 "Hide" – 4:48
 "Mystery to Me" – 4:25
 "Stop Bringing it Down on a Perfect Day" – 3:47
 "Carried Away" – 4:53
 "Getting Higher" – 4:22
 "Something Good" – 3:48
 "It Ain't Over"  – 3:56
 "Of All the Things to Throw Away" – 4:08
 "Big Bad World" – 4:37
 "Hate It When I See You Cry" – 4:57
 "Get to the Bottom" – 3:21
 "Going's Good" – 4:17

Personnel
 Colin James - guitars, vocals
 Pat Steward - drums, percussion

References

External links 
 Fuse

Colin James albums
2000 albums